Maddison Penn (born 9 May 1994) is an Australian professional basketball player.

Career

College
Penn began her college basketball career in 2013 at Virginia Tech in Blacksburg, Virginia for the Hokies in the Atlantic Coast Conference of NCAA Division I. However, in 2014, Penn departed Virginia Tech and returned home to Australia. In 2016, she reassumed her college career at the University of British Columbia in Vancouver, British Columbia with the Thunderbirds as a sophomore.

WNBL
Penn made her WNBL debut in 2012, with the Australian Institute of Sport. After a year of college basketball, she returned and Penn was signed as a development player with the Sydney Uni Flames for the 2014–15 WNBL season.

National team

Youth level
Penn made her international debut for the Gems at the 2012 FIBA Oceania Under-18 Championship in Porirua, New Zealand. She would once again represent the Gems at the Under-19 World Championship in Lithuania the following year, where they finished in third place and took home the bronze medal.

References

1994 births
Guards (basketball)
Australian women's basketball players
Sydney Uni Flames players
Virginia Tech Hokies women's basketball players
University of British Columbia alumni
Sportswomen from New South Wales
Living people
People educated at Pymble Ladies' College